The AIR Awards of 2008 is the third annual Australian Independent Record Labels Association Music Awards (generally known as the AIR Awards) and was an award ceremony at The Corner Hotel, in Melbourne, Australia on 24 November 2008 to recognise outstanding achievements of local artists who release their work through an Australian-owned independent record label and distribute their work through a locally-owned distribution firm. The event was again sponsored by German liquor brand, Jägermeister. 

The event was hosted by Jane Gazzo and Jake Stone from independent band, Bluejuice and Australian pay-TV music broadcaster Channel V aired the ceremony on 16 December 2008.

The categories for Best Hard Rock/Punk Album and Hip Hop Album were added to list of awards.

Performers
Eddy Current Suppression Ring 
Felicity Urquhart 
Grafton Primary 
Lior 
The Drones with Martha Wainwright
The Getaway Plan 
The Herd

Nominees and winners

AIR Awards
Winners are listed first and highlighted in boldface; other final nominees are listed alphabetically.

See also
Music of Australia

References

2008 in Australian music
2008 music awards
AIR Awards